Peter Lindau (born 9 December 1972) is a retired Swedish football midfielder.

He started his career in Halmstads BK, and joined Lunds BK in 1994. He broke his leg and only got three matches, but joined IS Halmia the next year. He joined Ayr United in August 1999, and remained with them until August 2000. In between he spent time on loan at Partick Thistle from December 1999 to March 2000. In August 2000 he joined Partick Thistle permanently, leaving them in June 2001. He then joined Strømsgodset IF, and played eleven Norwegian Premier League game in 2001, scoring four goals. Strømsgodset were relegated, but Lindau stayed there until after the 2004 season. He was rumored to transfer to IF Birkebeineren, Mjøndalen IF or Hønefoss BK, but chose Kongsvinger IL. He scored 12 goals in 67 games over three seasons.

Ahead of the 2008 season he became head coach of IS Halmia.

References

1972 births
Living people
Swedish footballers
Halmstads BK players
Ayr United F.C. players
Partick Thistle F.C. players
Strømsgodset Toppfotball players
Kongsvinger IL Toppfotball players
Eliteserien players
Scottish Football League players
Swedish expatriate footballers
Expatriate footballers in Scotland
Expatriate footballers in Norway
Swedish expatriate sportspeople in the United Kingdom
Swedish expatriate sportspeople in Norway
Swedish football managers
IS Halmia players
IS Halmia managers
Association football midfielders